Frederick Lealand Talbot (June 28, 1941 – January 11, 2013) was an American Major League Baseball pitcher. He pitched from 1963 to 1970 for the New York Yankees, Kansas City / Oakland Athletics, Seattle Pilots, and Chicago White Sox. He attended Fairfax High School in Fairfax, Virginia.

After his baseball career ended, Talbot worked in the construction business before retiring in 1996. He died following a long illness in Falls Church, Virginia, on January 11, 2013, at age 71.

References

External links
, or Retrosheet

1941 births
2013 deaths
Baseball players from Washington, D.C.
Chicago White Sox players
Holdrege White Sox players
Indianapolis Indians players
Iowa Oaks players
Kansas City Athletics players
Lynchburg White Sox players
Major League Baseball pitchers
New York Yankees players
Oakland Athletics players
Rapiños de Occidente players
Seattle Pilots players
Charleston White Sox players
Idaho Falls Russets players
American expatriate baseball players in Venezuela